"Little Darling" is a single by Australian rock musician, Jimmy Barnes. It was released in November 1990 as the third single from his fourth studio album, Two Fires. The song peaked at number 39 on the Australian ARIA Singles Chart.

Track listing
7" single
Side A "Little Darling" 
Side B "No Frills"

Charts

References

Mushroom Records singles
1990 singles
1990 songs
Jimmy Barnes songs
Song recordings produced by Don Gehman
Songs written by Jimmy Barnes